Hazelwood Township is an inactive township in Webster County, in the U.S. state of Missouri.

Hazelwood Township was erected in 1855, taking its name from an extinct community of the same name, which in turn was named after a grove of hazelnut trees near the site.

References

Townships in Missouri
Townships in Webster County, Missouri